MTV Ex Or Next is an Indian television dating reality show that airs on MTV India. The show is based on Ex on the Beach. It is a social experiment where cast members staying abroad and beginning relationships in the presence of their exes.

Contestants

Season 1

Episodes

Season 1

References

Indian reality television series
2022 Indian television series debuts
Dating and relationship reality television series